The 2020–21 Pro50 Championship was the nineteenth edition of the Pro50 Championship, a List A cricket tournament that was played in Zimbabwe. It started on 18 April 2021, with five teams taking part, and was the final domestic tournament in Zimbabwe's cricket calendar for the 2020–21 season. There was no defending champion, as the previous tournament was voided due to the COVID-19 pandemic.

Following the conclusion of the group stage, Tuskers and Eagles advanced to the third-place play-off, and Rocks and Rhinos qualified for the final of the tournament. Rhinos won the tournament, beating Rocks by 47 runs in the final.

Points table

 Advanced to the Final
 Advanced to the 3rd Place Play-Off

Fixtures

Round-robin

Finals

References

External links
 Series home at ESPN Cricinfo

2021 in Zimbabwean cricket
Pro50 Championship